Sunset Park is a 1996 American sports comedy drama film directed by Steve Gomer, based upon a screenplay by Seth Zvi Rosenfeld and Kathleen McGhee-Anderson. The film stars Rhea Perlman as the head coach of a high school boys basketball team from the Sunset Park neighborhood in New York City. The film also stars Onyx rapper Fredro Starr and features an early film appearance from Terrence Howard. It was produced by Perlman's husband Danny DeVito.

Filming took place in New York City. Included in filming locations were various high schools and public buildings as well as the world-famous Madison Square Garden. The Sunset Park soundtrack featured one of the first solo appearances of Ghostface Killah. Sunset Park was released on April 26, 1996 and went on to gross about $10 million at the box office.

Plot
Phyllis Saroka is a P.E. teacher at Sunset Park High School in New York City, who reads a flyer that her school is looking for a new boys basketball coach. Looking for more money to pursue opening a restaurant on St. Croix, Virgin Islands, she decides to give the job a shot despite knowing nothing of basketball. She contacts the correct people and is given the job.

She shows up for her first day on the job and the team is already skeptical of her. When she walks in, she lets basketball players run the team, calling their own fouls, running their own plays, and basically allowing them to be carefree. During a game, she makes some bad decisions which irks some of the players on the team. This inspires her to learn more about the game with the assistance of her players. They help her and the team begins to slowly find success.

The team also has to deal with outside forces that threaten the team. Tyrik "Shorty Doo-Wop" Russell is on probation and eventually gets into more trouble. Spaceman is also on probation, is constantly using drugs, and has trouble with a teacher. Busy-bee got shot during the season and misses several games.

Several other players are having academic trouble and some don't even get along with each other. The team also find out that the coach only plans to stay with them one season and then leave to open a restaurant.

The team eventually comes together despite their differences and troubles. They end up with very successful season, and get into the city championship. They go to Madison Square Garden to face their opponent (Washington Heights) and lose by a small margin. Afterward, the coach informs them that they should be proud of themselves and that she will return next season.

Cast
 Rhea Perlman as Phyllis Saroka, a physical education coach who takes a job coaching boys basketball at Sunset Park. First, she takes the job to earn extra money for a year to open a restaurant but begins to become close to the team and eventually helps make them successful. She informs the team she will return next season after the city championships.
 Fredro Starr as Tyrik "Shorty Doo-Wop" Russell, the leader of the Sunset Park basketball team. He becomes the closest to the new coach and helps her out the most. He turns on her once he finds out about her restaurant plan and begins acting out. He then comes back to lead the team.
 Terrence DaShon Howard as "Spaceman", a care-free, weed smoking, quiet member of the team and a close friend of Shorty. He eventually becomes a key component of the team on the inside. He has conflict with a teacher as the film progresses, and his friendship with Shorty is tested when Shorty begins acting out.
 Carol Kane as Mona, Phyllis's best friend who supports all of Phyllis's decisions and brags about her achievements to others.
 Camille Saviola as Barbara, a lawyer and friend of Phyllis. At Phyllis's request, she defends Shorty when he gets into legal trouble. She gets very angry when she finds out Shorty actually committed the crime he was accused of and she got him off the charges.
 De'aundre Bonds as "Busy-Bee", the undersized youngest player on the team. He is very supportive of the team and his teammates. He yearns to play but does not get very many chances to do so as he got shot while somebody tried to steal his coat. When he returns, he is given the chance to play and becomes successful.
 James Harris as "Butter", the main post player on the team. He is a ladies man and is constantly bragging about how many women he has and has had in the past.
 Antwon Tanner as "Drano", a guard who at first is scared to shoot the ball despite having good shooting skills. He is eventually given the confidence to shoot more and becomes a long-range threat for the team. He is also seen as the smart guy of the team because of his excellent school work. He is actually seen tutoring other team members.
 Anthony Hall as Andre, a member of the team who takes a free throw at Madison Square Gorden which he misses.
 Shawn Michael Howard as Kurt
 Guy Torry as "Boo Man", a comedic character and heckler in the crowd during Sunset Park's games. He is constantly making fun of the players, their game, and the coach. Later in the film, however, he becomes more positive and supportive of the team.
 John Vargas as Mr. Santiago, the principal that acts as a minor antagonist to both the coach and the players.

Reception
The film has a 13% rating on Rotten Tomatoes.

See also
 White savior narrative in film
 List of hood films

References

External links

1996 comedy-drama films
American basketball films
American sports comedy-drama films
1990s sports comedy-drama films
Films set in Brooklyn
1990s hip hop films
Films about alcoholism
TriStar Pictures films
Films directed by Steve Gomer
Films produced by Danny DeVito
Films scored by Miles Goodman
1990s English-language films
1990s American films